Devour You is the second studio album by American rock band Starcrawler. The album was released on October 11, 2019 by Rough Trade Records. The record was produced by Nick Launay, who previously worked for bands as Yeah Yeah Yeahs, Arcade Fire and Nick Cave and the Bad Seeds.

Critical reception 

Devour You received positive reviews from music critics upon its release. At Metacritic, which assigns a normalized rating out of 100 to reviews from mainstream publications, the album received an average score of 72, based on 7 reviews.

AnyDecentMusic? collated reviews giving the album an average score of 6.8 based upon 7 reviews.

Track listing

Notes
First pressings have a typo of the band's name, with "STARCRAWLER" stylized as "STARCRAWER".
"Pet Sematary" is a cover version of the Ramones song featured in the motion picture soundtrack for the self-titled film Pet Sematary. The track is included in the album exclusively for Japan.
The band's label, Rough Trade, also released a limited edition, deluxe version of the album that was pressed on blood-red marbled vinyl, and came in a scratch & sniff sleeve (the rose on the cover can be scratched and it smells like a rose).

Charts

References

2019 albums
Starcrawler albums
Rough Trade Records albums
Albums produced by Nick Launay